Ramón Humberto Dovalina (born July 13, 1943), is the retired fifth president of Laredo Community College, a two-year institution with the main campus on the grounds of historic Fort McIntosh on the Rio Grande in his native Laredo in Webb County in South Texas. With service from July 5, 1995, until August 31, 2007, Dovalina left the position with two years remaining in his contract. Under Dovalina, the physical appearance of the college was upgraded, the scholarship endowment fund increased from $100,000 in 1995 to more than $1
million in 2007, the institution advanced a 10-year master plan for new technology, and a  $50 million South Campus was opened.

On September 28, 2007, Dovalina and his predecessor, Roger L. Worsley, were each named president emeritus during the sixtieth anniversary celebration of the founding of LCC, originally Laredo Junior College.

Uncle
One of Dovalina's uncles, Alfredo G. Dovalina (1915–2017), was awarded three Bronze Star Medals and other citations with the United States Army in World War II and played professional baseball for teams in both Texas and Mexico, including Lockhart, Fort Worth, Tampico, and Monterrey. He was an inductee of the Laredo Latin American Hall Fame and the Rio Grande Valley Baseball Hall of Fame. For thirty-two years, Alfredo Dovalina was the Laredo fire marshal. Upon his death at the age of 101, he was the oldest living firefighter in Laredo.

References

1943 births
Living people
American people of Mexican descent
Heads of universities and colleges in the United States
People from Austin, Texas
People from Laredo, Texas
People from Corpus Christi, Texas
Laredo Community College alumni
University of Texas at Austin College of Education alumni
Texas A&M University–Kingsville alumni
Martin High School (Laredo, Texas) alumni
United States Marines
Texas Democrats
Activists for Hispanic and Latino American civil rights
Chicano
Activists from Texas